Ceratosauridae is an extinct family of theropod dinosaurs belonging to the infraorder Ceratosauria. The family's type genus, Ceratosaurus, was first found in Jurassic rocks from North America. Ceratosauridae is made up of the genera Ceratosaurus, found in North America, Tanzania, and Portugal, and Genyodectes, from the Early Cretaceous of Argentina. Unnamed probable ceratosaurids are known from limited material in the Middle Jurassic of Madagascar, the Late Jurassic of Switzerland, the Late Jurassic of Tanzania, and the Late Jurassic or possibly Early Cretaceous of Uruguay.

Classification
Othniel Charles Marsh named the family Ceratosauridae in 1884 to contain the type species, Ceratosaurus nasicornis. Since then, a number of other species have been referred to this family, mainly from the genus Ceratosaurus. Currently recognized ceratosaurid species include Genyodectes serus and possibly Eoabelisaurus mefi, C. stechowi and Ostafrikasaurus are undiagnostic ceratosaurs. Delcourt (2018) defined Ceratosauridae as "the most inclusive clade containing Ceratosaurus nasicornis but not Carnotaurus sastrei".

Features

Due to the paucity of remains of Genyodectes, it is difficult to discern possible synapomorphies of the group from autapomorphies of Ceratosaurus; e.g. Ceratosaurus is different from other ceratosaurians by the very prominent horn on its snout; Genyodectes, however, was not found with a complete skull; whether it had a horn is unknown, so it cannot establish that the horn was a shared derived feature of the group. However, due to the shared similarities between the teeth of the two genera, synapomorphies have been recognized in the teeth. These are: overlap of the second and third premaxillary alveoli in palatal view, largest crown in subadults/adults higher than six centimeters, subquadrangular mesial denticles at two-thirds of the crown in lateral teeth.

There are two known types of Ceratosaurus teeth: one with longitudinal ridges and the other with veined enamel. Both types of teeth have crowns with a teardrop-shaped cross section and carinae running up the middle. The cross section of the tooth's base depends on the position of the tooth in the mouth with front teeth having less symmetric cross sections.

Environment
Being found in the Morrison and Tendaguru put the family Ceratosauridae in the presence of other large predators.  In North America, it is likely that members of the family such as C. nasicornis competed with allosaurids (A. fragilis) for food, such as sauropods common to the region at the time. In Africa and Europe members also competed with other large predators for similar food sources. The presence of C. nasicornis at the Cleveland-Lloyd Dinosaur Quarry along with the remains of several allosaurids is a good indication of just how close members of this family and other predators coexisted.

Sites containing ceratosaurids
Dry Mesa Quarry (part of the Morrison Formation), Colorado/United States (Ceratosaurus)
Cleveland-Lloyd Dinosaur Quarry (part of the Morrison Formation), Utah/United States (Ceratosaurus)
Tendaguru, Mtwara Region/Tanzania (Ceratosaurus)
 Valmitão beach, Portugal (Ceratosaurus)
Cañadón Grande, Chubut Province/Argentina (Genyodectes)

See also
 Timeline of ceratosaur research

References

Encyclopedia of Dinosaurs, Brooks, Britt Ph.D., Kenneth Carpenter Ph.D., Catherine A. Forster Ph.D., David D. Gillette Ph.D., Mark A. Norell, George Olshevsky, J. Michael Parrish Ph.D., David Weishampel Ph.D., Publications International 2002, pp. 34,87
Megatheropod Tooth from the Late Tithonian Middle Berriasian (Jurassic- Cretaceous transition) Galve (Aragon, NE Spain)  José Ignacio Canudo, José Ignacio Ruiz-Omeñaca Marc Aurell, José Luis Barco and Gloria Cuenca-Bescos, Zaragoza
Discovering Dinosaurs in the American Museum of Natural History, Norell, Mark A., Eugene S. Gaffney, Lowell Dingus: Alfred A. Knopf 1995. pp. 110
 

Ceratosaurs
Late Jurassic first appearances
Early Cretaceous extinctions
Taxa named by Othniel Charles Marsh
Prehistoric dinosaur families

de:Ceratosauridae